The 2008 Beach Handball World Championships are a twelve-team tournament in both men's and women's beach handball, held in the Cadiz at Cadiz beach in Andalusia, Spain between July 9 and July 13 .

Men
 Final ranking

Women
  Final ranking

External links

Beach Handball World Championships
Beach Handball World Championships
International handball competitions hosted by Spain
Sport in Cádiz
2008 in Spanish sport